Russian Canadian Info is the largest among numerous Canadian periodicals in the Russian language.

History and profile
Russian Canadian Info was created as a small home-based business built by a family of immigrants from Saint Petersburg, Russia and had only 32 pages. The newspaper was founded in 1991. It now has around 56 pages of local, country and global information for Russian-speaking Canadians. It has the large circulation and the largest classified section among Russian speaking periodicals in Canada.

Russian Canadian Info is published on a weekly basis and is distributed free of charge. It has special arrangements with Canada Post to send it to subscribers throughout Canada and as far as British Columbia. The periodical is also sent to the United States.

Russian Canadian Info remains a privately owned business. The owner - Russian Infotrade Ltd. also run another newspaper, Gazeta Plus.

In 2004, Boris Nusenbaum, President of Russian Infotrade Ltd. launched the radio project Radio Plus and has invited three anchormen: a jazz-singer and short stories writer, Alla Kadysh; a radio DJ from Kazakhstan, Eugene Bychkov; and a former musician from the Bolshoi Theatre Vladimir Kanevski, who is also hosted from 2007 to 2012 his own news program for Russian-speaking TV Channel NTV Canada. The Radio Plus is the daily show (except Sundays) and broadcasts on a regular basis 08:00 PM to 09:00 PM (Eastern Standard Time) (1430 AM) and as well as on the websites www.radioplus.ca, www.RussianWeek.ca and www.Russians.ca

Authors writing for Russian Canadian Info
Alexander Borodin
Vladimir Galperin (USA)
Alla Kadysh
Vladimir Kanevski
Alena Zhukova
Maro Sairyan
Leonid Berdichevsky
Vladimir Kanevski

Notes

External links
RadioPlus
RussianWeek in Russian

Cultural magazines published in Canada
Weekly magazines published in Canada
Free magazines
Magazines established in 1997
Russian-Canadian culture
Russian-language magazines
Magazines published in Toronto